Chhawla village is a census town in the South West district in the state of Delhi, India.

Demographics
According to the India census of 2001, Chhawla has a population of 9,047. Males constitute 57% of the population, females 40%, and 3% other.  Chhawla has an average literacy rate of 77%, higher than the national average of 59.5%, with male literacy of 83% and female literacy of 68%. Thirteen percent of the population is under the age of six.

References

Cities and towns in South West Delhi district